Heredity in Relation to Eugenics is a book by American eugenicist Charles Benedict Davenport, published in 1911. It argued that many human traits were genetically inherited, and that it would therefore be possible to selectively breed people for desirable traits to improve the human race. It was printed and published with money and support of the Carnegie Institution.  The book was widely used as a text for medical schools in the United States and abroad.

In its time, the book was a success and became one of the most influential books in the early-20th century eugenics movement in the United States. By the 1940s, however, the science in the book had become to generally be regarded as seriously flawed, and the book was blamed by some for contributing to widespread eugenic sterilization programs in the United States and to the racist policies of Nazi Germany and Hitler.

References

External links
 Heredity in Relation to Eugenics by Charles Benedict Davenport at the Internet Archive
Heredity in Relation to Eugenics at Google Books

1911 non-fiction books
Eugenics books